The  is a Japanese school located in the Lang'ata area of Nairobi, Kenya, in proximity to Karen. The school serves Japanese expatriate students.

History

The school was founded on 9 May 1970 (Shōwa 45), with its first campus in Hurlingham. The school had originated from volunteer teaching duties held at the Embassy of Japan in Nairobi that began in 1967. In January 1975 the school received permission to begin its junior high school classes. The first school camp was established in Tsavo Park in September 1976, and the wooden school on Gitanga Road in Lavington opened the following January. The current campus in Langata was completed on 26 June 1981.

On Wednesday August 16, 1995, 56-year-old Kuniaki Asano (浅野 邦章 Asano Kuniaki), the school's principal, died in an apparent robbery attempt, just as he was located at the school's entrance. Two gunmen shot him and stole his car. The shooting occurred during a crime wave in Kenya, which targeted foreigners and occurred in the early 1990s.

Operations
As of 1999 the school gave British English ESL language classes to students twice per week in the levels from primary one through junior high school. As of the same year the school does cultural exchange activities with Kilimani Primary School.

9th grade (third year of junior high school) student Yuko Watanabe (渡辺 優子 Watanabe Yūko) composed the school song's music and lyrics in July 1976. The school designed its school badge in July 1983, and the school flag was designed in October 1984. The school has held an anniversary day beginning in 1983.

Student body
As of 1999 the school had a total of 45 students, among them children of employees of the Embassy of Japan in Nairobi, Japan International Cooperation Agency (JICA), trading companies, and the Japanese school itself. As a result of the overall small size of the school, the class sizes were also small, ranging from 2 to 9. Some students were born in Kenya and had lived there all their lives, and most students stayed for the durations of their fathers' employment terms of two to three years. Most students lived in the "River Side" housing development.

See also

Cairo Japanese School

References
 Africa Development (Afrique Et Développement), Volume 26. Council for the Development of Economic and Social Research in Africa, 2002. 
 Coplin, William D. The ... Political Risk Yearbook: Sub-Saharan Africa. Frost & Sullivan, 1996.
 Mickolus, Edward F. Terrorism, 1992-1995: A Chronology of Events and a Selectively Annotated Bibliography. ABC-CLIO, January 1, 1997. , 9780313304682.

Notes

Further reading

 Hidaka, Hiroko (日高 博子 Hidaka Hiroko). 『コンザ村の子どもたち―ケニア・ナイロビ日本人学校教師の記録』 ("Children of Konza Village - Record of a teacher of the Nairobi Japanese School, Kenya"). Holp Shuppan. November 1984. . - Profile at Google Books, Record from the National Diet Library (Archive)
 Hidaka, Hiroko (日高 博子 Hidaka Hiroko; 大阪市立田島中学校教諭). "Japanese Overseas School as an Alien School : A Nairobi Case Study" (外国人学校としての日本人学校 : ナイロビ日本人学校のばあい). Research Bulletin of International Education (国際教育研究) 2, 1-5, 1983-03. Tokyo Gakugei University. See profile at CiNii.
 Takahashi, Chihiro (高橋 千裕 Takahashi Chihiro; Biological Laboratory, College of General Education, Nagoya University) and Minako Takahashi (高橋 みな子 Takahashi Minako; English Department, Nagoya Junior College). "Kenya as viewed by Japanese schoolchildren in Nairobi" (ナイロビ日本人学校生徒の見たケニア). Bulletin of the Nagoya University Museum (Furukawa Museum) (名古屋大学総合研究資料館(古川資料館)報告) 4, 115-124, 1988-12. Nagoya University. See profile at CiNii.
 大澤 陽介. "経験者に聞く! 海外教師生活 ナイロビ日本人学校 不安におびえていては、もったいない。危険かつ不便な環境も楽しめるほど異文化を知ることは、何事にも代え難い経験だった (特集 広がる視野! 新たな可能性の発見! 「海外で教える」という選択) ." 総合教育技術 66(10), 64-67, 2011-10. 小学館. See profile at CiNii.

External links
  Nairobi Japanese School 
  Nairobi Japanese School (Archive)
 Nairobi Japanese School
  Nairobi Japanese School
  ナイロビ日本人学校 at Twitter
  ナイロビ日本人学校創立40周年記念 (NJS 40 Years)
  "ナイロビ　NAIROBI." (Archive) The Fuji Fire and Marine Insurance Co., Ltd.

Asian-Kenyan culture in Nairobi
International schools in Nairobi
Japanese international schools in Africa
Nairobi
Private schools in Kenya
Japan–Kenya relations
Educational institutions established in 1970
1970 establishments in Kenya